Grafton is a city in the State of North Dakota and is the county seat of Walsh County.  As of the 2020 Census, the city of Grafton had a population of 4,170, making it the fifteenth largest city in North Dakota. Grafton was founded in 1881.

History

The Grafton area was first settled by Thomas E Cooper in early 1879. He became postmaster later that year when a post office was constructed as part of expansions in service for the Northern Pacific Railway and the Great Northern Railway. It was incorporated as a village in 1881 and then became a city in 1903. In 1881, Walsh County was established and Grafton was subsequently designated the county seat. The city was named for Grafton County, New Hampshire, the native home of a large share of its early settlers.

The Grafton State School, a home for the developmentally disabled, is listed on the National Register of Historic Places.

Government
The city employs a mayor-council government where the mayor is elected for a four-year term and eight city council members are elected to staggered four-year terms. There are four at-large members of the city council while the remaining four members are elected from the four wards of the city. Currently, Chris West is serving as mayor while the city council members are as follows: Shane Mohn (1st Ward), Greg Young (2nd Ward), Philip Ray (3rd Ward), Don Hutson (4th Ward), David Fellman (At-large), Chris Lipsh (At-large), Brian Sieben (At-large), and Mary Stark (At-large).

Geography

Grafton is located at  (48.416082, −97.410633).

Demographics

2010 census
As of the census of 2010, there were 4,284 people, 1,776 households, and 1,073 families living in the city. The racial makeup of the city was 89.2% White, 0.4% African American, 2.8% Native American, 0.4% Asian, 0.1% Pacific Islander, 5.4% from other races, and 1.7% from two or more races. Hispanic or Latino of any race were 14.1% of the population.

There were 1,776 households, of which 27.6% had children under the age of 18 living with them, 45.4% were married couples living together, 10.2% had a female householder with no husband present, 4.8% had a male householder with no wife present, and 39.6% were non-families. 35.2% of all households were made up of individuals, and 15.4% had someone living alone who was 65 years of age or older. The average household size was 2.27 and the average family size was 2.92.

The median age in the city was 42.5 years. 23.5% of residents were under the age of 18; 8.1% were between the ages of 18 and 24; 21.5% were from 25 to 44; 27.7% were from 45 to 64; and 19.2% were 65 years of age or older. The gender makeup of the city was 48.4% male and 51.6% female.

2000 census
As of the census of 2000, there were 4,516 people, 1,804 households, and 1,143 families living in the city. The population density was 506.9/km2 (1,312.2/mi2). There were 2,005 housing units at an average density of 225.0/km2 (582.6/mi2). The racial makeup of the city was 91.67% White, 0.58% African American, 1.35% Native American, 0.38% Asian, 4.69% from other races, and 1.33% from two or more races. Hispanic or Latino of any race were 9.57% of the population, making Grafton the city with the highest percentage of Hispanics in North Dakota. 

The top 6 ancestry groups in the city are Norwegian (39.4%), German (19.8%), French (8.9%), Polish (8.7%), Czech (8.3%), Irish (7.4%).

There were 1,804 households, out of which 31.2% had children under the age of 18 living with them, 49.6% were married couples living together, 10.4% had a female householder with no husband present, and 36.6% were non-families. 33.1% of all households were made up of individuals, and 16.6% had someone living alone who was 65 years of age or older. The average household size was 2.35 and the average family size was 2.98.

In the city, the population was spread out, with 24.2% under the age of 18, 7.4% from 18 to 24, 26.3% from 25 to 44, 23.1% from 45 to 64, and 19.0% who were 65 years of age or older. The median age was 40 years. For every 100 females, there were 92.3 males. For every 100 females age 18 and over, there were 89.1 males.

Education

The city of Grafton is served by the Grafton Public Schools system.  The system includes Century Primary Elementary School (grades Pre-K–2), Century Intermediate Elementary School grades (3–6) Grafton Junior High School (grades 7–8), and Grafton High School (grades 9–12).

North Valley Career and Technology Center is a multi-district regional technology education center, serving students grades 9–12 from across the region.

Library
Grafton's Carnegie Regional Library opened in 1897 and is North Dakota's first public library.  Carnegie's collection contains 49,005 volumes and circulates 33,620 items per year. The library, including its 3 branches, serves a population of over 27,000 residents.

Media

Local print and online news
 Walsh County Record
 Walsh County Daily News

Local radio

AM radio

FM radio

Sites of interest

 Walsh County Courthouse – The Walsh County Courthouse has been listed on the National Register of Historic Places since 1985.
 Centennial Center
 Elmwood historic home
 Fair Oaks Golf Club – a nine-hole golf course located in Grafton
 Grafton Winter Sports Arena – site of the former Winter Sports Arena, the first indoor hockey arena in North Dakota.
 Chandler Field – named after Albert "Happy" Chandler

Notable people

 Albert "Happy" Chandler, 44th and 49th governor of Kentucky; US senator; commissioner of Major League Baseball; Chandler Field is named after him
 Pablo Garza, mixed martial arts featherweight fighter with the Ultimate Fighting Championship
 William E. Gorder, teacher, farmer, and North Dakota state representative
 Les Lear, offensive tackle in the Canadian Football League and National Football League
 Raymond W. Lessard, bishop of Savannah (1973–1995)
 Clint Ritchie, actor (Clint Buchanan on One Life to Live)
 Barry Tallackson, forward for the St. Louis Blues

Notes

External links
 City of Grafton official website

Cities in North Dakota
Cities in Walsh County, North Dakota
County seats in North Dakota
Populated places established in 1881
1881 establishments in Dakota Territory